Victoria De Angelis (born 28 April 2000) is an Italian bassist. She founded the rock band Måneskin in 2015 alongside vocalist Damiano David, guitarist Thomas Raggi, and Ethan Torchio, with whom she won the Sanremo Music Festival 2021 and subsequently the Eurovision Song Contest 2021 for Italy with the song "Zitti e buoni".

Early life 
De Angelis was born in Rome to a Danish mother and Italian father. Her mother died from cancer when she was 15. She has a sister who is three years younger. From a young age,  according to her, rock music embodied a desire for freedom. Having had a passion and fondness for music since childhood, De Angelis started playing guitar at the age of 8 and began playing bass in the seventh grade.

During an interview for Elle, she revealed she suffered from panic attacks at age 14, which caused her to miss a year of school. De Angelis attended the middle school Scuola Media Gianicolo where she met fellow band member and guitarist Thomas Raggi and later on completed her schooling at Liceo Classico Virgilio.
De Angelis cited Nick O'Malley and Kim Gordon as her influences.

Career 
De Angelis and Thomas Raggi first met each other during middle school. They were later joined by Damiano David in high school in Rome. Ethan Torchio who lived in nearby Frosinone joined them when they advertised for a drummer on Facebook to complete the line-up.

Although De Angelis and Raggi first formed the band in 2015, it wasn't until 2016 that it was made official when the members had to choose the band's name because they had decided to register for Pulse, a local music contest for emerging bands.

They later performed as buskers in the streets of the Colli Portuensi district of Rome, and in 2017, they rose to prominence when they finished second in the eleventh season of the Italian talent show X Factor. The band had a breakthrough debut with the studio album Il ballo della vita and tour in 2018 and 2019. In 2021, their second studio album Teatro d'ira: Vol. I was released.

References

External links 

Living people
2000 births
Women bass guitarists
Italian bass guitarists
Italian women guitarists
Italian women songwriters
21st-century bass guitarists
21st-century Italian guitarists
21st-century Italian women musicians
Italian people of Danish descent
Musicians from Rome
Måneskin members
21st-century women guitarists